Saade Maade Teen is a 2007 Marathi language comedy film. It is one of the breakthrough movie for actor Bharat Jadhav. It has music given by Ajay–Atul. The movie is remake of popular Hindi movie Chalti Ka Naam Gaadi.

Plot
The story is of 3 brothers- the family head ‘Ratan Dada’ Ashok Saraf and his 2 brothers Madan Makarand Anaspure and Chandan Bharat Jadhav, running their Kurale garage. The younger duo never dares to go against dada's wish. Dada is a character who hates female because of his first love. A girl (Sukanya Kulkarni) betrayed him after a marriage proposal.

Cast
Bharat Jadhav as Chandan
Siddharth Jadhav as Baban
Makarand Anaspure as Madan
Ashok Saraf as Ratan
Amruta Khanvilkar as Madhura
Sujata Joshi as Sharvari
Arun Nalawade as Rao Sahab
Sumeet Raghavan as himself
Uday Tikekar as Viredra Saheb

Music

References

External links

2006 films
Indian comedy films
2006 comedy films
2000s Marathi-language films
Films scored by Ajay–Atul
Marathi remakes of Hindi films
Films about siblings 
Films about brothers